Gjergji Dëma (born 7 August 1971) is a retired Albanian international football player.

Club career
Dema spent his Albanian career with Flamurtari in the 1980s and 1990s, winning a league title in a team featuring fellow international players Eqerem Memushi, Kreshnik Çipi, Rrapo Taho, Sokol Kushta and Agim Bubeqi.

International career
He made his debut for Albania in a December 1990 European Championship qualification defeat by Spain and earned a total of 10 caps, scoring no goals. His final international was a March 1997 FIFA World Cup qualification match against Ukraine.

Honours
Albanian Superliga: 1
 1991

References

External sources
 
 Gjergji Dëma on Playerhistory.com

1971 births
Living people
Footballers from Vlorë
Albanian footballers
Association football defenders
Albania international footballers
Flamurtari Vlorë players
NK Svoboda Ljubljana players
NK Rudar Velenje players
NK Beltinci players
NK Ljubljana players
NK Radomlje players
Albanian expatriate footballers
Expatriate footballers in Slovenia
Albanian expatriate sportspeople in Slovenia